Jeanne Faivre d'Arcier (born 1950) is a French novelist, short-story writer and writer of children's stories.

Early life
Jeanne Faivre d'Arcier was born on 31 August 1950 in Paris. She studied classics at the Paris Nanterre University and at the Institute of Political Studies in Paris. She is married, with no children. Her first novel, La Ceinture, was published in 1980, when she was 29, and is an autobiographical novel about anorexia.

Career
Faivre d'Arcier's attempts to follow up La Ceinture were unsuccessful and she failed to get her novels published. She became a headhunter for the cosmetics and luxury goods industry and stopped writing. Later, she met a publisher, who would become both her companion and literary advisor. On his suggestion, she started to read thrillers by English-language authors, such as Stephen King, Peter Straub, and Graham Masterton, which inspired her to begin writing again. In 1993, she published a new novel: Rouge flamenco, biographie d'une vampire (Rouge flamenco, portrait of a vampire flamenco dancer) about a dancer who was transformed into a vampire in a brothel in Algiers. This became the first of a trilogy of novels on vampires, being followed by La Déesse écarlate (The Scarlet Goddess) in 1997, which was set in India, and Le Dernier Vampire (The Last Vampire) published in 2012, which takes place during the French Revolution. The trilogy is often compared to the work of the American Gothic fiction writer, Anne Rice.

Faivre d'Arcier has travelled widely in the Middle East, India and Southeast Asia, which are areas that have inspired her writing. Her stories have a recurring theme of sexual transgression. Habiba Messika, la brûlure du péché (Habiba Messika: The Burning of Sin), published in 1997, is a fictionalized biography of a Jewish singer and actress from Tunis burned alive by a lover she had rejected. In 2003 Faivre d'Arcier wrote a novel about Genghis Khan entitled Gengis Khan et le loup bleu.
       
Faivre d'Arcier has also written noir fiction, including L'ange blanc s'habille en noir (The White Angel wears black) in 2001, Les Yeux de cendre (The eyes of ashes) in 2006, and Les Passagers du roi de Rome (The passengers of the King of Rome) in 2009. In 2008, she retired from her work as a headhunter, and devoted herself to writing. She lives in Paris and in Cap Ferret, close to Bordeaux in the Gironde region of France. Recent novels and stories have been inspired by the Pigalle district of Paris and Arcachon Bay, of which Cap Ferret is a part. Faivre d'Arcier's novels for children between 9 and 12 also often draw inspiration from the Cap Ferret area. They include Tempête au Cap Ferret (Storm at Cap Ferret) and Nuit d'Angoisse à l'île aux Oiseaux (Night of Anguish at the Île aux Oiseaux). The stories are particularly popular with children from the area. Novels for teenagers, such as Le vampire de Bacalan, are also set in the Bordeaux area.
       
Faivre d'Arcier has also published numerous short stories that appear in various collections. She is a member of the Société des gens de lettres de France, the writers' association founded in 1838 by Honoré de Balzac, Victor Hugo, Alexandre Dumas, and George Sand. She is also a member of l'Association des amis de Chester Himes à Bordeaux et sur le basin (ACHAAB), an association of authors of thrillers who come from the south-west of France. Every September the association organizes the thriller festival, Polar en Cabanes, in Gujan Mestras in the Gironde.

Awards
In 1998, Faivre d'Arcier won the Prix Ozone for La Déesse écarlate, the second part of her trilogy, which draws on Hindu mythology. Her short story, Monsieur Boum-Boum, published in the anthology Cosmica Erotica, won her the Grand prix de l'Imaginaire for French short stories in 2001. She received the short story prize at the Blaye literature festival in 2015 and the readers' prize for her entire œuvre at the thriller festival in Gujan Mestras in the same year.

Publications

Novels
  Under the name of Jeanne Rusca

Books for young people

Short stories

References

External links
 Interview at the Paris Book Salon, 2012
  Faivre d'Arcier talks about her work

1950 births
living people
People from Paris
French women novelists
French women short story writers
20th-century French novelists
20th-century French women writers
20th-century short story writers